is a Japanese manga series written and illustrated by Yukiwo. The series began serialization in Flex Comix's Comic Meteor web magazine in April 2012. Twenty volumes have been released as of December 2022. An anime television series adaptation by Nomad aired from July to September 2018, with an additional episode streamed online in October 2018. A second season aired from April to June 2020, and a third season aired from July to September 2022.

Plot
A human witch and also college student named Yurine Hanazono summons the lamia Jashin ("Evil God") from Hell. Unable to go back to Hell by herself, Jashin spends each day unsuccessfully trying to kill Yurine while simultaneously spending time with her and various acquaintances from Heaven and Hell.

Characters

A human who summoned Jashin to Earth. She is relentless in brutally attacking Jashin as penance for her actions, but is generally kind to others. As the only human among the main characters, Yurine often acts as the voice of reason and avatar of the audience, sarcastically commenting on the silly antics of the characters surrounding her.

A self-centered lamia who was summoned from Hell by Yurine. She possesses regenerative abilities which allows her to recover from whatever bloody punishment Yurine inflicts. Although it seems that Jashin is an absolutely immoral girl who manipulates Medusa or mocks Pekola without any regrets, at heart she is capable of good deeds and appreciates her close friends. However, as Yurine notes, Jashin is embarrassed by this and tries to hide the good traits of her personality because of her tsundere nature.

A gorgon from Hell who is close friends with Jashin, despite the latter seeing her more as a walking cash machine. She and Jashin are pretty close, to such a level that their relationship leaves Yurine a feel of a "boy-girl relationship", with Jashin often behaving like an immoral husband who constantly manipulates her "wife" Medusa for the sake of monetary gain. At the same time, the tender side of Medusa allows her to discover the hidden good side of Jashin, which allows them to remain closest persons and regularly emphasize their strong bonds and interdependence. While outdoors, she wears a paper bag on her head to avoid accidentally turning people into stone.

An angel who lost her halo and became stranded on Earth. She is often starved due to not having any money, but is also somewhat defiant in accepting kindness from Yurine as she believes her to be a witch. She is later on teased, often being called "Tajiri" with people assuming that as her last name as it is the name on the swimsuit she borrows from her coworker.

A minotaur who is friends with Jashin and lives next to Yurie's apartment. Despite being based on a cow, she has no qualms about eating beef.

Pekola's former subordinate, who seeks to kill Pekola so she can take her place as a fully-fledged angel. However, she loses her powers after Jashin eats her halo, taking up jobs as both a ramen shop worker and an idol.

A devil who descended to the earth in order to search for Jashin-chan. A running gag is that she and Jashin-chan had been nearby each other several times but never noticed each other's presence. She is the daughter of the Underworld God, Hades and Persephone. She later lives with Minos.

Jashin-chan's teacher and mother of Persephone II who stays on Earth to study human culture. She currently works at an orphanage.

A ditzy police officer who falls for Jashin on sight and tries to take her for herself. She refers to Jashin as "Orochimaru" and often brings anything she considers cute to her home.

An yuki-onna who looks after her younger sister, Koji and sells shaved ice.

Yusa's little sister, who Jashin nicknames . Her blood produces strawberry flavored syrup while her urine produces lemon flavored syrup. She has the face of a mole, can't speak and has been abducted by Mei multiple times.

A Beast of Gévaudan that Yurine keeps as a pet outside of her apartment.

Another of Pekola's former subordinates, who seeks to kill Pekola and Poporon due to their acquaintance with demons. However, she loses her powers after Poporon breaks her halo. She takes up a job as the custodian outside Yurine's apartment since the demon residents would prevent the Heaven from pursuing her. She is extremely paranoid.

A Jiangshi girl from Hell China who wishes to become a human. She works at a bookstore.

Kyon-Kyon's sister who was turned into a panda and now resides in Kyon-Kyon's dress, though she's able to leave it.

Pekola, Poporon and Pino's superior who arrives at Earth in order to destroy the human civilization after a meeting with other gods. She takes the form of a child and resides in the orphanage where her old friend Persephone works. She also expresses some childlike traits, such as being obsessed with cartoons or interested in a panda-shaped spring rider. 

A Baphomet and the narrator in the anime.

A vampire and the spoiled princess of Hell Transylvania. 

Ecute's educator who becomes very aggressive when enraged.

A guest character which appears regularly during the third season.

Media

Manga
The original series by Yukiwo began serialization in Flex Comix's Comic Meteor web magazine in April 2012. Twenty volumes have been released as of December 12, 2022. The 148th chapter of the manga was removed from Comic Meteor on May 29, 2019, due to a knife attack on a train that happened in Japan on May 28, 2019. A spin-off manga by Shushu Yuki, titled , was published as a one-shot manga on August 29, 2018 and later received a serialization from May 15, 2019. The series was compiled into a tankobon on April 9, 2020.

Anime
An 11-episode anime television series adaptation by Nomad aired on BS Fuji from July 9 to September 17, 2018 and was streamed internationally on Amazon Prime Video. A bonus episode was streamed exclusively on Amazon Video on October 1, 2018. Hikaru Sato directed the series, Kazuyuki Fudeyasu oversaw the series scripts, and also wrote the scripts alongside Momoko Murakami. Makoto Koga served as both character designer and chief animation director, and Yuki Kurihara and Yuzuru Jinma composed the music. The opening theme song  was performed by Aina Suzuki, Nichika Ōmori, Miyu Kubota, Yurie Kozakai, Chiaki Omigawa, Rico Sasaki, and Riho Iida as their respective characters, while the ending theme song "Home Sweet Home" was performed by Yutaro Miura. A twelfth episode premiered in mid-November 2019.

A second season was greenlit for production after the first season managed to sell over 2,000 Blu-ray and DVD copies. The second season, titled Dropkick on My Devil!! Dash, aired from April 6 to June 15, 2020, with Amazon Prime Video releasing all 11 episodes in Japan on April 6, and Tokyo MX, Tochigi TV, Sun TV and Hokkaido Cultural Broadcasting airing episodes weekly. Crunchyroll streamed the second season worldwide excluding Asia. The opening theme song  was performed by Halca, while the ending theme song "Love Satisfaction" was performed by Zamb.

A crowdfunding event for a third season was started. It was announced that if the fundraising goal was met, the third season "will take more than a year to produce" and the production committee "aimed to broadcast the third season in 2022". The crowdfunding goal was reached in 33 hours, so the production of the third season was officially greenlit. The season, titled Dropkick on My Devil! X, aired from July 6 to September 21, 2022. Taku Yamada joined Hikaru Sato as director, while Supa Love composed the music. The opening theme song  was performed by Halca featuring Aina Suzuki. VTuber KAF and virtual singer Kafu performed the ending theme .

Season 1

Season 2

Season 3

Controversy
The series has attracted some controversy as Furano City Council, where the series is set, announced on November 16, 2022, that it rejected to hand over production funds in the hometown tax system after airing the ninth episode in its third season due to its "socially unacceptable" content. The committee had voted 7 to 7 on whether to hand over the funds with the chairman having the deciding vote, thus denying to hand over the JP¥33 million (US$236,116) in funds to the production committee.

Notes

References

External links
 Manga official website 
 Anime official website 
 

2012 manga
Amazon Prime Video original programming
Animation controversies in television
Anime and manga controversies
Anime series based on manga
Comedy anime and manga
Comic Meteor manga
Crossover anime and manga
Crunchyroll anime
Japanese webcomics
Nomad (company)
Shōnen manga
Webcomics in print